Thomas Robert Mason (April 29, 1920 – December 1, 1980) was an American chiropractor, who was best known for appearing in films directed by Ed Wood. Ed Wood was married to one of Mason's former patients.

Biography
Best known as the stand-in for the deceased Bela Lugosi in Wood's 1957 movie Plan 9 from Outer Space, Mason, who was taller than and bore little physical resemblance to Lugosi, hunched over and held a cape over his face in all of his scenes.  Mason appeared in (and helped produce) two of Ed Wood's other movies, including Night of the Ghouls and Final Curtain, after which his career in showbiz ended. Mason's wife, Margaret Mason, played the role of "Martha Edwards" in Night of the Ghouls as well.

Tom Mason died in Orange, California, in 1980, at age 60. His wife Margaret was one of the people interviewed in the 1992 Ed Wood documentary Flying Saucers Over Hollywood. (She died soon after the interview in 1992, at age 81.)

Legacy
In 1994, Mason was portrayed in director Tim Burton's film Ed Wood by actor Ned Bellamy.

Filmography
 Plan 9 from Outer Space (1957) (as the stand-in for Bela Lugosi)
 Final Curtain (1957) 1/2-hour projected pilot for a TV series
 Night of the Ghouls (1959) as Zombie sitting in Coffin
 Flying Saucers Over Hollywood (1992 documentary) archive footage

See also
 Fake Shemp

References

External links

1920 births
1980 deaths
American chiropractors
American male film actors
Male actors from Los Angeles
20th-century American male actors